The Parish Church of St Clement is the parish church of the parish of Saint Clement in Jersey. It is one of the twelve "Ancient Parish Churches" of Jersey.

In ancient Latin documents the church is referred to as Ecclesia Sancti Clemtentis de Petravilla in Gersuis which translates to "the Church of St. Clement on the estate of Peter in Jersey".

History
The church's origins lie with a privately owned fort which is thought to have been destroyed during the Viking raids. Construction of the stone church began around the year 911, starting with a chapel; now the nave.

Establishment of the parish church
The church became a parish church no later than 1067, because it is known that Duke William II of Normandy granted half the tithes of the church to Montivilliers Abbey in Upper Normandy. and only parish churches were permitted to collect tithes.

Buried in the churchyard
 Sir James Knott, 1st Baronet
 Cecil Stanley Harrison

See also
Religion in Jersey

References

External links

 The Website of St Clement's Church, Jersey

 
Churches in Jersey
Diocese of Winchester